The Brahmani River  is a tributary of the Dwarka River.

Etymology

Course
The Brahmani originates in the Santhal Parganas in Jharkhand and then flows through Birbhum district, bisecting Rampurhat subdivision. It finally flows through Murshidabad district, where it joins the Dwarka River.

It is a hill stream with beds full of pebbles and yellow clay.

Baidhara barrage

Gallery

See also
Santhal Parganas
List of rivers of India

References

External links

Rivers of Jharkhand
Rivers of West Bengal
Rivers of India